Aleksandras is a Lithuanian male given name derived from Alexander. People with this name include:

Alexander Jagiellon (1461–1506), Grand Duke of Lithuania and King of Poland
Aleksandras Abišala (born 1955), former Prime Minister of Lithuania
Aleksandras Ambrazevičius (born 1953), Lithuanian politician
Aleksandras Antipovas (born 1955), long distance runner
Aleksandras Dičpetris (1906–1968), Lithuanian poet and educator
Aleksandras Lileikis (1907–2000), Lithuanian Holocaust perpetrator
Aleksandras Fromas-Gužutis (also known as Gužutis; 1822–1900), Lithuanian writer
Aleksandras Machtas (1892–1972), chess master
Aleksandras Plechavičius (1897–1942), Lithuanian military officer
Aleksandras Stulginskis (1885–1969), President of Lithuania
Aleksandras Štromas (1931–1999), political scientist

Lithuanian masculine given names